Parrissa Amouhan-Etchi Eyorokon (born September 15, 1986) is an American soccer midfielder who last played for Washington Freedom of Women's Professional Soccer. She attended Purdue University.

References

External links
 US Soccer player profile
 WPS player profile

1986 births
Living people
American women's soccer players
Washington Freedom players
Soccer players from Ohio
Purdue Boilermakers women's soccer players
Women's association football midfielders
People from West Chester, Butler County, Ohio
African-American women's soccer players
American people of Ivorian descent
21st-century African-American sportspeople
21st-century African-American women
20th-century African-American people
20th-century African-American women
Women's Professional Soccer players